John Wesley Work Jr. (August 6, 1871 – September 7, 1925) was the first African-American collector of folk songs and spirituals, and also a choral director, educationalist and songwriter.  He is now sometimes known as John Wesley Work II, to distinguish him from his son, John Wesley Work III.

Early life
Work was born in Nashville, Tennessee, the son of Samuella and John Wesley Work, who was director of a church choir, some of whose members were also in the original Fisk Jubilee Singers. John Wesley Work Jr. attended Fisk University, where he organized singing groups and studied Latin and history, graduating in 1895. He also studied at Harvard University.

Career
Work then taught in Tullahoma, Tennessee and worked in the library at Fisk University, before taking an appointment as a Latin and history instructor at Fisk in 1904. His colleague, instructor and registrar Minnie Lou Crosthwaite, later commented on his deep interest in the "progress and welfare of his students", though he had conflicts with others in the Fisk music department.

With his wife and his brother, Frederick Jerome Work, Work began collecting slave songs and spirituals, publishing them as New Jubilee Songs as Sung by the Fisk Jubilee Singers (1901) and New Jubilee Songs and Folk Songs of the American Negro (1907).  The latter book included the first publication of "Go Tell It on the Mountain", which he may have had a hand in composing.  His other songs included "Song of the Warrior", "If Only You Were Here", "Negro Lullaby", and "Negro Love Song". He also established the music publishing company, Work Brothers and Hart.

As the director of the Fisk Jubilee Singers, he was responsible for taking them on tour each year.  However, because of negative feelings toward black folk music at Fisk, he was forced to resign his post there in 1923.  He then served as president of Roger Williams University in Nashville, until his death in 1925.

Personal life and death
Work married Agnes Haynes in 1899. They had six children, of whom John Wesley Work III (1901–67) also worked as the director of the Fisk Jubilee Singers and as a song collector and composer.

Work died on September 7, 1925.

References

External links
 
Stuart A. Rose Manuscript, Archives, and Rare Book Library, Emory University: John Wesley Work papers

1871 births
1925 deaths
African-American songwriters
American musicologists
People from Nashville, Tennessee
American folklorists
Fisk University alumni
Singers from Tennessee
Fisk University faculty
Harvard University alumni
Songwriters from Tennessee
20th-century African-American people
19th-century musicologists